Jean Magnon (died 1662) was a French playwright.

Selected works
Le Gran Tamerlan et Bejezet (1648), on Tamerlane and Bayezid I
Tite (1660), tragi-comedy on the life of Titus and his affair with Berenice
Zénobie, Reyne de Palmire (1660), tragedy on the life of Zenobia
 Encyclopedia: La science universelle (1663)

External links
https://openlibrary.org/a/OL2031297A/Jean-Magnon

1662 deaths
Year of birth missing
17th-century French dramatists and playwrights
17th-century French male writers